This is an incomplete list of the continuing Acts of the Parliament of Canada. Many of these Acts have had one or more amending Acts.

1867 – 1899 

 Aliens and Naturalization Act, 1868
 Fisheries Act, 1868
 Gradual Enfranchisement Act, 1869
 Manitoba Act, 1870
 Bank Act, 1871
 Dominion Lands Act, 1872
 Parliament of Canada Act, 1875
 Supreme and Exchequer Courts Act, 1875
 Indian Act, 1876
 Canada Temperance Act, 1878
 Naturalization and Aliens Act, 1881
 Chinese Immigration Act, 1885
 Rocky Mountains Park Act, 1887
  Criminal Code, 1892
 Canada Evidence Act, 1893
 Quebec Boundary Extension Act, 1898

1900 – 1929 

 Alberta Act, 1905
 Saskatchewan Act, 1905
 Juvenile Delinquents Act, 1908
 Immigration Act, 1910
 Naval Service Act, 1910
 Quebec Boundaries Extension Act, 1912
 Finance Act, 1914
 Naturalization Act, 1914
 War Measures Act, 1914
 Military Service Act, 1917
 Military Voters Act, 1917
 Wartime Elections Act, 1917
 Civil Service Act, 1918
 Statistics Act, 1918
 Women's Franchise Act 1918
 Canada Highways Act, 1919
 Dominion Elections Act, 1920
 Food and Drugs Act, 1920
 Canadian Nationals Act 1921
 Chinese Immigration Act, 1923
 Combines Investigation Act 1923
 National Defence Act, 1923

1930 – 1949 

 National Parks Act, 1930
 Natural Resources Acts, 1930
 Unemployment and Farm Relief Act, 1931
 Bank of Canada Act, 1934
 Public Works Construction Act, 1934
 Succession to the Throne Act, 1937
 National Housing Act, 1938
 National Resources Mobilization Act, 1940
 Family Allowance Act, 1945
 Canadian Citizenship Act, 1946
 Canadian Overseas Telecommunication Corporation Act, 1948

1950 – 1979 

 Canada Council for the Arts Act, 1957
 Hospital Insurance and Diagnostic Services Act, 1957
 Canadian Bill of Rights, 1960
 Narcotic Control Act, 1961
 Canada Labour Code, 1967
 Criminal Law Amendment Act, 1968–69
 Arctic Waters Pollution Prevention Act, 1970
 Consumer Packaging and Labeling Act, 1970
 Weights and Measures Act, 1970
 Divorce Act, 1968 - replaced by Divorce Act, 1985
 Canada Wildlife Act, 1973
 National Symbol of Canada Act, 1975
 Anti-Inflation Act 1975
 Immigration Act, 1976
 Canadian Human Rights Act, 1977
 Canadian Football Act 1974

1980 – 1989 

 Tax Court of Canada Act, 1980
 Privacy Act, 1982
 Access to Information Act, 1983
 Tax Court of Canada Act, 1983
 Western Grain Transportation Act, 1983
 Canada Health Act, 1984
 Foreign Extraterritorial Measures Act, 1984
 Young Offenders Act, 1984
 Asia Pacific Foundation of Canada Act, 1985
 Auditor General Act, 1985
 Canada Agricultural Products Act, 1985
 Divorce Act (R.S., 1985, c. 3 (2nd Supp.))
 Aeronautics Act, R.S. 1985
 Bankruptcy and Insolvency Act, 1985
 Canada Business Corporations Act, 1985
 Companies' Creditors Arrangement Act,  1985
 Criminal Records Act, 1985
 Lobbying Act, 1985
 Pest Control Products Act, 1985
 Radiocommunication Act, 1985
 Employment Equity Act, 1986
 Canada Agricultural Products Act, 1988
 Canadian Centre on Substance Abuse Act, 1988
 Canadian Multiculturalism Act, 1988
 Emergencies Act, 1988
 Heritage Railway Stations Protection Act, 1988
 Mutual Legal Assistance in Criminal Matters Act, 1988
 Official Languages Act, 1988

1990 – 1999

 Canadian Space Agency Act, 1990
 Integrated Circuit Topography Act, 1990
 Broadcasting Act, 1991
 Bank Act, 1991
 Contraventions Act, 1992
 Transportation of Dangerous Goods Act, 1992, 1992
 Telecommunications Act, 1993
 Firearms Act, 1995 1995
 Controlled Drugs and Substances Act, 1996
 Winding-up and Restructuring Act, 1996
 Nuclear Safety and Control Act, S.C. 1997
 Tobacco Act, 1997
 Canada Marine Act, 1998
 DNA Identification Act, 1998
 Canadian Environmental Protection Act, 1999, 1999
 Clarity Act, 1999
 Corruption of Foreign Public Officials Act, 1999

 2000 – 2009 

 Canada Elections Act, 2000
 Canada National Parks Act, 2000
 Crimes Against Humanity and War Crimes Act, 2000
 Personal Information Protection and Electronic Documents Act, 2000
 Canada Foundation for Sustainable Development Technology Act, 2001
 Immigration and Refugee Protection Act, 2001
 Proceeds of Crime (Money Laundering) and Terrorist Financing Act, 2001
 Anti-Terrorism Act, 2001
 Species at Risk Act, 2002
 Youth Criminal Justice Act, 2002
 Canadian Environmental Assessment Act, 2003
 An Act to amend the Criminal Code (protection of children and other vulnerable persons) and the Canada Evidence Act, 2004
 Assisted Human Reproduction Act, 2004
 International Transfer of Offenders Act, 2004
 Pledge to Africa Act, 2004
 Wage Earner Protection Program Act, 2005
 Civil Marriage Act, 2005
 Federal Accountability Act, 2006
 Public Servants Disclosure Protection Act, 2007
 Veterans' Bill of Rights,, 2007
 Heritage Lighthouse Protection Act, 2008
 Official Development Assistance Accountability Act,, 2008
 Tackling Violent Crime Act, 2008
 Electronic Commerce Protection Act, 2009

 2010 – 2019 

 Canada Consumer Product Safety Act, 2010
 Fighting Internet and Wireless Spam Act, 2010
 Copyright Modernization Act, 2012
 Jobs, Growth and Long-term Prosperity Act, 2012
 Jobs and Growth Act, 2012, 2012
 Preventing Persons from Concealing Their Identity during Riots and Unlawful Assemblies Act, 2012
 Protecting Canada's Immigration System Act, 2012
 Safe Streets and Communities Act,, 2012
 Succession to the Throne Act, 2013, 2013
 Combating Terrorism Act, 2013
 Fair Elections Act, 2014
 Protecting Canadians from Online Crime Act, 2014
 Anti-terrorism Act, 2015, 2015
 An Act to amend the Canadian Human Rights Act and the Criminal Code, 2016
 Cannabis Act, 2018
 Tobacco and Vaping Products Act, 2018 (formerly the Tobacco Act)
 Accessible Canada Act, 2019
 Ending the Captivity of Whales and Dolphins Act, 2019
 Impact Assessment Act and Canadian Energy Regulator Act, 2019
 Oil Tanker Moratorium Act, 2019

 2020 – present 

 Preserving Provincial Representation in the House of Commons Act'', 2022

See also
 List of Canadian provincial Acts

External links
 Statutes of Canada, 1867 to 1872 at Canadiana.org
 Acts of the Parliament of the Dominion of Canada, 1873 to 1900 at Canadiana.org
 Acts of the Parliament (of the Dominion) of Canada, 1901 to 1997 at the Internet Archive
 Acts of the Parliament of Canada, 1987 to 2020 at the Government of Canada Publications catalogue.
 Official Justice Laws Website of the Canadian Department of Justice
 Constitutional Acts, Consolidated Statutes, and Annual Statutes at the Canadian Legal Information Institute
 Canadian Constitutional Documents: A Legal History at the Solon Law Archive.

Canada
Acts of Parliament of Canada
Statutory law by legislature